Don McCallum was an artist, historian, and art critic for the Kingston Whig-Standard in Ontario.

References

Canadian art historians
Canadian male non-fiction writers
Canadian art critics
Artists from Ontario
Living people
Year of birth missing (living people)